Super Extra Gravity is the sixth studio album by Swedish band the Cardigans. It was produced by Tore Johansson, who last worked with the Cardigans on Gran Turismo and later with the band Franz Ferdinand. The album was released in Germany and Ireland on 14 October 2005 and in the UK on 17 October 2005. A Japanese edition was later released. The first single released was "I Need Some Fine Wine and You, You Need to Be Nicer". The second single was "Don't Blame Your Daughter (Diamonds)". It was said that "Godspell"—the lyrics of which reference a conservative religious mentality common to the band's hometown of Jönköping—was to be the third single, but plans for its release fell through.

Singles
"I Need Some Fine Wine and You, You Need to Be Nicer" (8 October 2005, #59 UK)
"Don't Blame Your Daughter (Diamonds)" (6 February 2006, not released in UK)

The band planned to release "Don't Blame Your Daughter (Diamonds)" in the UK in April 2006, but this was cancelled because of the poor performance of the album and first single there. Instead, a two-track digital single was released on iTunes in the UK.
Promos were sent to radio in Europe for "Godspell" as a third single from the album, but a full commercial release never happened.

Track listing
All music by Peter Svensson; all lyrics by Nina Persson and Nathan Larson, except where noted.

 "Losing a Friend" (Persson) – 3:44
 "Godspell" – 3:29
 "Drip Drop Teardrop" (Persson) – 3:15
 "Overload" – 3:18
 "I Need Some Fine Wine and You, You Need to Be Nicer" – 3:33
 "Don't Blame Your Daughter (Diamonds)" – 3:37
 "Little Black Cloud" (Persson) – 3:26
 "In the Round" – 4:17
 "Holy Love" – 4:07
 "Good Morning Joan" – 3:37
 "And Then You Kissed Me II" – 4:01

Japanese and French editions bonus tracks
 "Bonus Track" – 0:22
 "Slowdown Town" – 4:09

UK edition bonus tracks
 "Bonus Tracks" – 0:22
 "Give Me Your Eyes" (Persson) – 3:23
 "Slow" – 4:03

Personnel
Peter Svensson – guitar, vocals
Magnus Sveningsson – bass, vocals 
Bengt Lagerberg – drums, percussion 
Lars-Olof Johansson – keyboards, piano
Nina Persson – lead vocals

Charts

Weekly charts

Year-end charts

Certifications

References

External links
 Official band website
 Super Extra Gravity microsite
 Music videos from Super Extra Gravity on the official website
 Polyhex UK chart information
 

2005 albums
The Cardigans albums
Albums produced by Tore Johansson